Todd Bardwick (born 1963) is an American author, chess teacher, and US National Chess Master from Denver, Colorado.  He was recognized by the United States Chess Federation with the highest lifetime title for a chess teacher, Professional Chess Coach (Level V), for his lifetime work running the Rocky Mountain Chess Camp through the Denver Chess Academy continuously since 1995.

Publications

 Teaching Chess in the 21st Century (2004), a training guide for school teachers and chess club sponsors, incorporating standards developed by the National Council of Teachers of Mathematics.
  
 Chess Workbook for Children (2006), a children's introduction to chess which parallels the chapters of Teaching Chess in the 21st Century. The workbook has been translated and sold in Russia, Korea, and the Czech Republic.
 
 Chess Strategy Workbook (2010). It was also translated and sold in Russia.
 
 From 2002 to 2017, Bardwick wrote "The Chess Detective" column for Chess Life for Kids, the national chess magazine for children published by the United States Chess Federation.
 
 From 1993 until the newspaper's closing in 2009, Bardwick wrote the monthly chess column for the Rocky Mountain News featuring interviews with famous sports stars, chess in the movies, and local, national, and world chess news.

References

Living people
1963 births
Date of birth missing (living people)
Place of birth missing (living people)
American chess writers
American chess players
Chess coaches
People from Denver